G. Raju Gouda was a politician from the state of Karnataka. He was a four term member M.L.A from Hanur constituency and Minister of State for Food Processing in the S.M. Krishna cabinet.

References 

Karnataka politicians
Year of birth missing

Politicians from Yadgir district
Karnataka MLAs 1978–1983
Karnataka MLAs 1985–1989
Karnataka MLAs 1989–1994
Karnataka MLAs 1999–2004
2004 deaths
Indian National Congress politicians from Karnataka